Igor Matić (born 22 July 1981) is a retired Serbian footballer who played as a deep-lying playmaker. He represented Serbia and Montenegro at the men's football tournament in the 2004 Summer Olympics.

Club career

Zemun
Matić began his senior football career with FK Zemun in 1998. As a 19-year-old, he was one of the players involved in Zemun's famous drive in the semifinals of the 1999-2000 Cup of Yugoslavia. He played for Zemun until 2003.

OFK Beograd
Matić joined OFK Beograd from Zemun in 2003, and played alongside Branislav Ivanović in one of the strongest generations of OFK Beograd that decade. One highlight of Matić's spell at OFK was making the 2004 UEFA Intertoto semifinals before being eliminated by Atlético Madrid.

Mogren
Matić joined Mogren from Grbalj in 2010, where he would spend two years and amass 43 appearances and contribute with 10 goals. In January 2012, Matić sued Mogren in Montenegro's arbitrage court because he wasn't paid for over five months.

Napredak
After leaving Mogren on a sour note, Matić joined Napredak Kruševac in January 2012, who had just hired Aleksandar Kristić as their coach. This was an important factor in Matić choosing to join Napredak, as he and Kristić had known each other since he was at OFK Beograd, as Kristić was one of OFK's youth coaches at the time.

Čukarički

After only a half-season with Napredak, Matić quickly joined Čukarički, which was in 2012 the first privatized professional football club in Serbia. He would become Čukarički's playmaker and contribute to their promotion to the first-tier SuperLiga. In an October 2013 article titled "They are the 'oldies', everyone fears them", Serbia's Sportal named Matić in an 11-man selection of the best players over the age of 28 in the SuperLiga. On 18 March 2015, he suffered a hamstring injury which sidelined him for two weeks. After five years with Čukarički, Matić retired from playing football professionally in 2017.

International career
Despite having born in Bugojno, SR Bosnia and Herzegovina, he opted to represent Serbia and Montenegr internationally.  Matić was part of the Serbia and Montenegro national under-21 team that finished runners-up at the 2004 European Championship. He was also part of the Serbia and Montenegro team at the 2004 Summer Olympics.

Honours
Čukarički
Serbian Cup (1): 2014–15

Notes and references

External links
 Igor Matić at lfp.fr
 Igor Matić at srbijafudbal.com

1981 births
Living people
People from Bugojno
Serbs of Bosnia and Herzegovina
Serbian footballers
Association football midfielders
FK Zemun players
OFK Beograd players
Stade Malherbe Caen players
FK Banat Zrenjanin players
OFK Grbalj players
FK Mogren players
FK Napredak Kruševac players
FK Čukarički players
Serbian SuperLiga players
Ligue 1 players
Ligue 2 players
Montenegrin First League players
Serbian expatriate footballers
Expatriate footballers in France
Expatriate footballers in Kazakhstan
Expatriate footballers in Montenegro
Footballers at the 2004 Summer Olympics
Olympic footballers of Serbia and Montenegro
Serbia and Montenegro under-21 international footballers
FC Megasport players